Naples phlebovirus is an antigenic species of genus Phlebovirus within the family Phenuiviridae of the order Bunyavirales. It is an enveloped RNA virus with a tripartite genome e Uukuniemi (UUK) serogroup. The Sandfly group's natural reservoir are sandflies, while the natural reservoir for Uukuniemi is ticks. The SFNV serogroup consists of two main serocomplexes associated with disease in humans, the Naples and Sicilian serocomplexes. Sandfly fever induces myalgia, fever, and elevated liver enzymes in humans. It is difficult to diagnose outside endemic areas.

Natural reservoir
Phlebotomine sandflies (Psychodidae) are the natural reservoir and transmit to humans via bite. Psychodidae has a wide geographical distribution.

References

External links
 Sandfly fever Naples virus taxonomy
 Database search results from the Viral Bioinformatics Resource Center

Phleboviruses